Abraham Jacob Sharadin (January 21, 1886 – 1964) was an American football, basketball and baseball player and coach. He served as the head football coach at the University of Connecticut in 1912, at Defiance College in Defiance, Ohio in 1920, and Cumberland Valley State Normal School—now known as Shippensburg University of Pennsylvania—from 1921 to 1922, compiling a career college football coaching record of 16–11–1. Sharadin was also as the head basketball coach at Defiance during the 1920–21 season, tallying a mark of 8–10. In 1923, he left the college ranks and began successful run at Ford City High School in Ford City, Pennsylvania, where he led the basketball and football teams from 1923 to 1931.

Sharadin played minor league baseball for the Chambersburg Maroons in 1915.

Head coaching record

College football

References

External links
 

1886 births
1964 deaths
American men's basketball players
Chambersburg Maroons players
Defiance Yellow Jackets football coaches
Defiance Yellow Jackets men's basketball coaches
Kutztown Golden Bears men's basketball players
Shippensburg Red Raiders baseball coaches
Shippensburg Red Raiders football coaches
UConn Huskies football coaches
High school basketball coaches in Pennsylvania
High school football coaches in Pennsylvania